Theodore Michael Shapiro (born September 29, 1971) is an American composer best known for his film scores. 

He is a frequent collaborator of directors Ben Stiller, Paul Feig, Jay Roach, Karyn Kusama, and Rawson Marshall Thurber, and won the 2022 Primetime Emmy Award for Outstanding Music Composition for a Series for his work on Stiller’s series Severance.

Life and career
Shapiro was born in Washington, D.C. and is of Italian descent. He earned a Bachelor of Arts degree in music from Brown University in 1993, followed by a Master of Fine Arts in music composition from the Juilliard School in 1995.

He is best known for his film scores, particularly for the comedies State and Main, 13 Going on 30, Along Came Polly, The Devil Wears Prada, Fun with Dick and Jane, Idiocracy, You, Me and Dupree, Wet Hot American Summer, Marley & Me, Tropic Thunder, the Jay Roach film Dinner for Schmucks and was one of the composers for Diary of a Wimpy Kid. In 2012, Shapiro composed his first animated film, The Pirates! Band of Misfits. He has also written other orchestral works.

Filmography

Films

TV series

References

External links
 Official website
Brief biography on Adwadagin Pratt's website
 

1971 births
American film score composers
American male film score composers
American television composers
Animated film score composers
DreamWorks Animation people
Brown University alumni
Juilliard School alumni
Living people
Male television composers
Musicians from Washington, D.C.
Varèse Sarabande Records artists
American people of Italian descent
Blue Sky Studios people
Primetime Emmy Award winners